There are four Alexander Grin House Museums. The first one is a house museum in the last place of residence of Russian writer Alexander Grin which was in Stary Krym, Crimea, Russia.

There is another Grin museum in Crimea in the nearby city of Theodosia. There is a third Alexander Grin museum in Russia, in Vyatka.

In 2010, a fourth museum was opened at the birthplace of the writer, in Slobodskoy, Kirov Oblast in Russia.

References

Museums in Crimea
Historic house museums in Russia
Literary museums in Russia

ru:Литературно-мемориальный музей Александра Грина (Феодосия)